XHJE-FM is a radio station on 94.1 FM in Puebla, Puebla. The station is owned by MVS Radio and carries its Exa FM pop format.

History

XHJE received its first concession on December 15, 1972. It was owned by Juan José Espejo Puente. The current concessionaire received the station's concession in 1993. Eventually, XHJE became part of Cinco Radio, a local station group.

In November 2016, XHJE flipped from Más 94 to romantic Pasión FM. The format moved to new station XHPUE-FM 92.1 on August 15, 2018, leaving XHJE-FM without a format. The move came after Cinco Radio was reported to have sold or leased XHJE to MVS Radio, which would move the Exa FM format from 98.7 XHPBA-FM. Exa was formally announced for XHJE on September 24, 2018, a week after XHPBA relaunched as Puebla's Los 40 station, with a full launch slated for October 1.

On October 3, 2018, the IFT approved the transfer of shares in Súper Sonido en Frecuencia Modulada from Grupo Salas, S.A. de C.V., Carlos Manuel Flores Núñez, Juan José de Jesús Espejo Munguía and Martha Verónica Martínez Valdivia to a subsidiary of MVS Radio.

References

External links
Exa FM Puebla Facebook

Radio stations in Puebla
Radio stations established in 1972